Offerton is a hamlet and former civil parish in Tyne and Wear, England. Situated about 4 miles west-southwest of Sunderland city centre. In 1961 the parish had a population of 133.

References 

Hamlets in Tyne and Wear
Former civil parishes in Tyne and Wear
City of Sunderland